Peixotto tram stop is located on line  of the tramway de Bordeaux.

Location
The station is located on the avenue Roul in Talence.

Junctions

TBC Network
 Réseau -Bus-

Trans Gironde Network

Close by
 Université Bordeaux 1
 Château Margaut
 Château Peixotto (Mairie de Talence)
 Jardin botanique de Talence

See also
 TBC
 Tramway de Bordeaux

External links
 

Bordeaux tramway stops
Tram stops in Talence
Railway stations in France opened in 2004